Guillaume Hoorickx otherwise Willem Hoorickx (12 April 1900 – 31 October 1983) was a Belgian ice hockey player. He competed in the men's tournament at the 1928 Winter Olympics. During World War II, he worked as an agent for Victor Sukolov in the Red Orchestra network. He was imprisoned in the Mauthausen-Gusen concentration camp.

He was also an artist, under the name Bill Orix. A collection of his works is held by the Royal Museums of Fine Arts of Belgium.

See also
 People of the Red Orchestra

References

External links
 

1900 births
1983 deaths
Belgian painters
Olympic ice hockey players of Belgium
Ice hockey players at the 1928 Winter Olympics
Place of birth missing
Red Orchestra (espionage)
World War II prisoners of war held by Germany
Belgian ice hockey centres
Sportspeople from Antwerp